Tatjana Lematschko (March 16, 1948 – May 17, 2020) was a Soviet-born Swiss chess player, She was born in Moscow, but lived in Bulgaria for several years.

She won both the Women's Bulgarian Chess Championship and Swiss Chess Championship several times.

She has competed for the world championship, most recently in the Women's World Chess Championship 1999.

At the 27th Chess Olympiad she won a medal for the best performance on no. 1 board.

WGM Tatjana Lematschko died in Zurich, aged 72.

References

External links
her games

Swiss chess players
1948 births
2020 deaths
Sportspeople from Moscow
Russian State University of Physical Education, Sport, Youth and Tourism, Department of Chess alumni
Soviet emigrants to Switzerland